The following is a list of notable deaths in December 1995.

Entries for each day are listed alphabetically by surname. A typical entry lists information in the following sequence:
 Name, age, country of citizenship at birth, subsequent country of citizenship (if applicable), reason for notability, cause of death (if known), and reference.

December 1995

1
Dennis Allen, 55, American actor and comedian.
Emil Banjavic, 80, American football player.
O. Roy Chalk, 88, American entrepreneur.
Vaman Krushna Chorghade, 81, Indian writer and educator.
Luigi Giacobbe, 88, Italian cyclist.
Henry Holbert, 68, American football player and coach.
Martti Liimo, 54, Finnish basketball player.
Sergio Pesce, 79, Italian cinematographer.
Colin Tapley, 88, New Zealand actor.
Maxwell R. Thurman, 64, American Army general, leukemia.

2
Robertson Davies, 82, Canadian novelist, heart attack.
Art Herring, 89, American baseball player.
Roxie Roker, 66, American actress (The Jeffersons), breast cancer.
Mária Telkes, 94, Hungarian-American biophysicist, scientist and inventor.
Biem Dudok van Heel, 81, Dutch sailor and Olympian.
Ira Wallach, 82, American screenwriter and novelist, pneumonia.

3
Josep Bartolí, 85, Spanish painter, cartoonist and writer.
Genni Batterham, 40, Australian film maker, writer and disability rights activist, multiple sclerosis.
James Colgate Cleveland, 75, American politician 
Jimmy Jewel, 85, British comedic actor.
Alexander Kaidanovsky, 49, Soviet/Russian actor, film director and screenwriter, heart attack.
Lautaro Murúa, 68, Chilean-Argentine actor, film director, and screenwriter, lung cancer.
Rodney Paavola, 56, American ice hockey player.
Gerard John Schaefer, 49, American murderer, serial killer, and police officer, stabbed.

4
Warren Ambrose, 81, American mathematician.
Little Beaver, 61, Canadian midget wrestler, pulmonary emphysema.
Leonidas Berry, 93, American pioneer in gastroscopy and endoscopy.
Giorgio Bocchino, 82, Italian fencer and Olympic medalist.
Petar Gligorovski, 57, Yugoslav and Macedonian animated film director and artist.
Rudolf Hruska, 80, Austrian automobile designer and engineer.
Robert Parrish, 79, American film director, editor, writer, and child actor.
Jerry White, 47, American convicted murderer, execution by electrocution.

5
Desmond Flower, 10th Viscount Ashbrook, 90, Irish peer and soldier.
Ilio Bosi, 92, Italian communist politician and trade unionist.
Reiner Bredemeyer, 66, German composer.
Bill Bruton, 70, American Major League Baseball player, traffic accident.
L. B. Cole, 77, American comic book artist.
Charles Evans, 77, British mountaineer, surgeon, and educator.
Victor Matthews, Baron Matthews, 76, British peer and proprietor of the Daily Express.
Lisa McPherson, 36, American member of the Church of Scientology, pulmonary embolism.
Clair Cameron Patterson, 73, American geochemist.
Keith Runcorn, 73, British geophysicist.

6
Yvonne Chauffin, 90, French writer and critic.
Gerard Cowhig, 74, American gridiron football player.
Cosslett Ó Cuinn, 88, Irish Anglican priest and biblical scholar.
Busta Jones, 44, American musician.
Trevor Key, 48, British photographer, brain tumour.
Melvin Kranzberg, 78, American historian.
Margaret Mayall, 93, American astronomer.
Jack Milne, 88, American speedway rider.
Robert Earl O'Neal, 34, American white supremacist and convicted murderer, execution by lethal injection.
Robert Phalen, 58, American actor (Halloween, Starman, Three Days of the Condor), complications from AIDS.
Claire Polin, 69, American composer, flautist and musicologist.
Luis Regueiro, 87, Spanish football player and Olympian.
James Reston, 86, American journalist.
Mario Vicini, 82, Italian road bicycle racer.
Dmitri Volkogonov, 67, Russian historian and Colonel general, brain cancer.

7
James Derek Birchall, 65, English chemist, materials scientist, and inventor, traffic accident.
Edmund D. Campbell, 96, American lawyer and politician.
Harry Cavers, 85, Canadian politician.
Nick Connor, 91, American politician.
Mildred Adams Fenton, 96, American paleontologist and geologist.
Kathleen Harrison, 103, English actress.
Stella Inda, 71, Mexican film actress, pneumonia.
Joe Kelly, 90, Australian politician.
Johnny Mowers, 79, Canadian ice hockey player.
Masashi Watanabe, 59, Japanese football player and manager.

8
James Austin, 82, American football player.
Arthur Birch, 80, Australian organic chemist.
Ernest L. Boyer, 67, American educator and United States Commissioner of Education.
Tom Burns, 89, British-Chilean publisher and editor.
Bill Coldwell, 63, English football manager and scout.
John Gillett, 69-70, British film critic and researcher.
George J. Lewis, 91, Mexican actor, stroke.
Robert Manuel, 79, French actor and film director.
Maino Neri, 71, Italian football player and manager.
Ding Shande, 84, Chinese composer.

9
Severo Antonelli, 88, American photographer.
Toni Cade Bambara, 56, American author, documentary film-maker, and social activist, colorectal cancer.
Vivian Blaine, 74, American actress (Guys and Dolls) and singer, heart failure.
Mario Brini, 87, Italian prelate.
George Brown, 80, British sailor and Olympic athlete.
Pierre-Georges Castex, 80, French academic, literary critic and author.
Hugh Clegg, 75, British academic and director, stroke.
Tom Cole, 88-89, Australian labourer, outdoorsman and author.
Benoit Comeau, 79, Canadian politician.
Douglas Corrigan, 88, American aviator.
Gwen Harwood, 75, Australian poet.
Benny Lee, 79, Scottish comedy actor and singer.
Gillian Rose, 48, British philosopher and non-fiction writer, ovarian cancer.
Katharine Way, 93, American physicist.

10
Godfrey Agnew, 82, British civil servant.
Alex Aronson, 83, German author.
Kamal Bhattacharya, 80, Indian cricketer.
Bonvi, 54, Italian comic book artist, car accident.
Saša Božović, 83, Yugoslav partisan, physician, and author.
Sarvadaman Chowla, 88, British-Indian American mathematician.
Mary Lascelles, 95, British literary scholar.
Paul Lohmann, 69, American cinematographer (Coffy, Nashville, Mommie Dearest).
Lavinia Fitzalan-Howard, Duchess of Norfolk, 79, British noblewoman.
Phil Piratin, 88, British communist politician.
Darren Robinson, 28, American rapper, cardiac arrest, heart attack.

11
Greg Bahnsen, 47, American Calvinist philosopher, apologist, and debater, complications following surgery.
Étienne Becker, 59, French cinematographer.
Allene Jeanes, 89, American chemical researcher.
Arthur Mullard, 85, English actor, comedian and singer.
Euan Robertson, 47, New Zealand distance runner and Olympian, heart attack.
Abolhassan Sadighi, 101, Iranian sculptor and painter .
Robert Shelton, 69, American music and film critic.
Miko Tripalo, 69, Croatian politician.

12
Roberto Agramonte, 91, Cuban ambassador, philosopher, and politician.
Ike Altgens, 76, American photojournalist, photo editor, and field reporter, carbon monoxide poisoning.
Evangeline Bruce, 81, American society hostess and writer.
R. Ramanathan Chettiar, 82, Indian businessman and politician.
Ángel Crespo, 69, Spanish poet and translator.
Princess Caroline-Mathilde of Denmark, 83, Danish princess.
Giovanni Giacomazzi, 67, Italian football player.
Sanusi Hardjadinata, 81, Indonesian politician.
Oles Honchar, 77, Ukrainian writer and public figure.
Lyudmil Kirkov, 61, Bulgarian film director and actor.
David Lightbown, 63, British politician.
Andrew Nelson Lytle, 92, American novelist, dramatist, and essayist.
David Marshall, 87, Singaporean politician and first Chief Minister, lung cancer.
Moshe-Zvi Neria, 82, Israeli Orthodox writer and politician.
Andrew Olle, 47, Australian radio and television presenter, brain cancer.
Homer Thornberry, 86, American politician and judge.

13
Gerda Bengtsson, 95, Danish textile artist who specialized in embroidery.
Chrysanthos Mentis Bostantzoglou, 76-77, Greek political cartoonist, playwright, lyricist and painter.
Ernie Case, 75, American quarterback for UCLA Bruins football and the Baltimore Colts.
Ann Nolan Clark, 99, American writer who won the Newbery Medal.
René Cloërec, 84, French composer and conductor.
Anatoly Dyatlov, 64, Soviet engineer in charge during the Chernobyl disaster, heart attack.
Nancy LaMott, 43, American singer, uterine cancer.

14
Gustavus Hamilton-Russell, 10th Viscount Boyne, 64, Irish peer, soldier and banker.
Eddie Clamp, 61, English footballer.
G. C. Edmondson, 73, American science fiction author .
Rob Harris, 28, American skysurfer, accident.
Eduardo Simian, 80, Chilean football player and politician.
Constance Tipper, 101, English metallurgist and crystallographer.

15
János Adorján, 57, Hungarian handball player.
Calvin Clarke, 79, American baseball player in the Negro leagues.
Mano Dayak, 45, Nigerien Tuareg freedom fighter, activist and politician, plane crash.
Marion Holley, 85, American track and field athlete and Olympian.
Sariamin Ismail, 86, Indonesian novelist.
Miroslav Katětov, 77, Czech mathematician, chess master, and psychologist.
Johnny Lytle, 63, American vibraphone player.
Manuel Gutiérrez Mellado, 83, Spanish politician and minister, traffic collision.
Diana Poulton, 92, English lutenist.
Jan Říha, 80, Czech football player.

16
Albert Alberts, 84, Dutch writer, translator, and journalist.
Giulio Cappelli, 84, Italian footballer.
Simone Genevois, 83, French film actress.
Shui Hua, 79, Chinese film director and screenwriter.
Anthony Ingrassia, 51, American director, producer, and playwright.
Bert Marcelo, 59, Filipino television personality.
Johnny Moss, 88, American poker player.
Charles Sauriol, 91, Canadian naturalist.
Mariele Ventre, 56, Italian musician and singer, breast cancer.

17
Isa Alptekin, 94, Chinese Uyghur nationalist and pan-Turkic politician.
Hendrikus Berkhof, 81, Dutch theologian.
Alfred Bula, 87, Swiss racing cyclist.
Alfa Castaldi, 68, Italian photographer.
Arthur Cirilli, 80, American lawyer, politician, and judge.
Dorothy B. Porter, 90, American librarian, bibliographer and curator.
Olivette Thibault, 81, Canadian actress from Quebec.
Peter Warlock, 91, British magician.
Takuma Yasui, 86, Japanese economist.

18
Panchito Alba, 70, Filipino film actor.
Brian Brockless, 69, English organist and composer.
Maurie Fields, 70, Australian vaudeville performer, actor and stand-up comedian.
Yelena Miroshina, 21, Russian diver, fall.
António Roquete, 89, Portuguese football goalkeeper.
Nathan Rosen, 86, Israeli physicist.
Martin Růžek, 77, Czech actor.
Ross Thomas, 69, American writer of crime fiction, lung cancer.
Mohammad Yeganeh, 72, Iranian economist.
Konrad Zuse, 85, German engineer.

19
Nita Barrow, 79, Governor-General of Barbados, stroke.
Max Beer, 83, Swiss long-distance runner who competed in the 1936 Summer Olympics.
Linda Hayes, 77, American actress.
Jack Hively, 85, American film editor and film and television director.
René Lemoine, 89, French fencer and Olympian.
Masako Shinpo, 82, Japanese track and field athlete and Olympian.
Henri Virlogeux, 71, French actor.
Harold Watkinson, 85, British businessman and politician.

20
Suzanne Baron, 68, French film editor.
Alexina Duchamp, 89, American art dealer and wife of Marcel Duchamp.
John Jacques, Baron Jacques, 90, British businessman and politician.
Paris Kanellakis, 42, Greek American computer scientist.
Allan Mackintosh, 59, Danish physicist.
Mario Procaccino, 83, Italian-American lawyer and politician.
Maan Sassen, 84, Dutch politician.
Madge Sinclair, 57, Jamaican-American actress (Trapper John, M.D., Coming to America, The Lion King), Emmy winner (1991), leukemia.

21
Trenchard Cox, 90, British museum director.
Sammy Creason, 51, American session drummer, brain aneurism.
R. F. V. Heuston, 72, British professor of law.
Roddy Lamb, 96, American gridiron football player.
Boris Ponomarev, 90, Soviet politician, ideologist, and historian.

22
Jean Aubry, 82, French gymnast and Olympian.
Lawrence Berk, 87, American composer, pianist, and music educator.
Ted Carroll, 56, Irish hurler.
Pierre Cour, 79, French songwriter and lyricist.
Ferris Jennings, 82, American gridiron football player.
Takuzo Kawatani, 54, Japanese film actor, lung cancer.
Osvald Käpp, 90, Estonian wrestler and Olympian.
David Land, 77, British impresario and theatre producer.
Butterfly McQueen, 84, American actress (Gone with the Wind, The Mosquito Coast, Duel in the Sun).
James Meade, 88, English economist.
Tom Pettit, 64, American journalist.

23
Helen Andersen, 76, Canadian artist, cancer.
Attilio Bulgheri, 82, Italian football player.
Ralph H. Demmler, 91, American lawyer.
Gabrielle Keiller, 87, Scottish socialite, golfer, art collector and archaeological photographer.
Karl Jamshed Khandalavala, 91, Indian Air Force officer, Parsi art connoisseur, and lawyer.
Patric Knowles, 84, English actor, cerebral hemorrhage.
Olof Rydbeck, 82, Swedish diplomat.

24
Phillip E. Areeda, 65, American lawyer and legal scholar, leukemia.
Aharon Becker, 90, Israeli politician.
Lojze Krakar, 69, Slovene poet, literary historian, and essayist.
Carlos Lapetra, 57, Spanish football player.
Geoffrey Pinnington, 76, British journalist.
Jo Schouwenaar-Franssen, 86, Dutch politician .
Jack Siggins, 86, Irish rugby player.

25
Frederick Becton, 87, United States Navy officer and destroyer commander during World War II.
Michel Berto, 56, French actor.
James Boucher, 85, Irish cricketer.
Chang Kee-ryo, 84, South Korean surgeon, educator, and philanthropist.
Akira Kono, 66, Japanese gymnast.
Emmanuel Levinas, 89, French-Lithuanian philosopher.
Marijan Lipovšek, 85, Slovenian pianist, composer and writer on music.
Dean Martin, 78, American singer ("Ain't That a Kick in the Head?", "That's Amore"), comedian and actor (The Dean Martin Show), pulmonary emphysema.
Henri Patrelle, 77, French football player and executive.
Allen Russell Patrick, 85, Canadian politician .
Víctor Peralta, 87, Argentine boxer.
Nicolas Slonimsky, 101, Russian-American musicologist.

26
Hüsamettin Böke, 85, Turkish footballer and referee.
Al DeRogatis, 68, American gridiron football player, cancer.
Walter Horn, 87, German-American medievalist scholar.
Ángel Sauce, 84, Venezuelan composer, conductor and teacher.

27
Ferdinand Auth, 81, German politician.
Al Barlick, 80, American umpire in Major League Baseball.
Jeremy John Beadle, 39, British critic, writer and broadcaster, AIDS-related complications.
Edgar Bischoff, 83, Romanian-French composer and lyricist.
Henk Bouwman, 69, Dutch field hockey player and Olympic medalist.
Lois Bulley, 94, British county councillor, philanthropist and political activist.
Thomas C. Chalmers, 78, American physician and medical researcher.
Shura Cherkassky, 86, Ukrainian-American concert pianist.
William Campbell Gault, 85, American writer.
Boris Gnedenko, 83, Soviet/Ukrainian mathematician.
Winslow Hall, 83, American rower and Olympian.
Syd Herlong, 86, American politician.
Oscar Judd, 87, Canadian-American baseball player.
Genrikh Kasparyan, 85, Soviet chess player.
Enzo Serafin, 83, Italian cinematographer.

28
Madeleine Barot, 86, French activist and theologian.
Virginius Dabney, 94, American teacher, journalist, and writer.
Maxwell Street Jimmy Davis, 70, American electric blues musician, heart attack.
Walther Killy, 78, German literary scholar.
Michel Michelet, 101, Ukrainian composer of film scores.
Howard C. Petersen, 85, American government official and banker.

29
Shirley Ascott, 65, British sprint canoer.
Nello Celio, 81, President of Switzerland.
Harold Collison, 86, British trade unionist.
Harry Cripps, 54, English football player.
Lita Grey, 87, American actress, cancer.
Hans Henkemans, 82, Dutch pianist, teacher, composer of classical music and psychiatrist.
Philippus Jacobus Idenburg, 94, Dutch statistician.
Johan Manusama, 85, Dutch Schoolteacher and Moluccan independence activist.

30
Poul Andersen, 65, Danish footballer.
Hubert Clompe, 85, Romanian ski jumper who competed in the 1936 Winter Olympics.
Ralph Flanagan, 81, American big band leader, pianist, composer, and arranger.
Doris Grau, 71, American script supervisor and voice actress (The Simpsons, The Critic, DuckTales), lung disease.
Richard Hornung, 45, American costume designer (Barton Fink, Miller's Crossing, Young Guns), AIDS.
Aleksandre Machavariani, 82, Georgian composer and conductor.
Heiner Müller, 66, German poet and playwright, laryngeal cancer.
Suzanne Prou, 75, French novelist.
Nestor Redondo, 67, Filipino comics artist.
Katarina Taikon, 63, Swedish civil rights activist, writer and actor.

31
David Anderson, 79, Scottish judge, politician and Solicitor General for Scotland.
Francis Woodman Cleaves, 84, American sinologist, linguist, and historian.
Gabriel d'Aubarède, 97, French novelist, literary critic and journalist.
Fritz Eckhardt, 88, Austrian actor, director, and writer.
Daniel O. Graham, 70, American Army officer.
Eduardo Hernández Moncada, 96, Mexican composer and conductor.
Bill Nyrop, 43, American ice hockey player, colon cancer.
Elisabeth Pinajeff, 95, Russian-German actress.

References 

1995-12
 12